WQOL (103.7 FM) is a radio station broadcasting a classic hits music format. Licensed to Vero Beach, Florida, United States, the station is currently owned by iHeartMedia, Inc.

On March 15, 2018, WQOL dropped the "Oldies 103.7" branding and now goes by "103.7 WQOL".

References

External links

QOL
Radio stations established in 1991
Classic hits radio stations in the United States
IHeartMedia radio stations
1991 establishments in Florida